The University of the District of Columbia (UDC) is a public historically black land-grant university in Washington, D.C. It was established in 1851 and is the only public university in the city. UDC is a member school of the Thurgood Marshall College Fund. The full university system offers workforce and certificate programs in addition to Associate, Baccalaureate, Master's, professional, and Doctoral degrees. The university's academic schools and programs include the UDC Community College, College of Arts and Sciences, School of Engineering and Applied Sciences, School of Business and Public Administration, Colleges of Agriculture, Urban Sustainability & Environmental Sciences, and David A. Clarke School of Law.

The university operates a flagship campus at Van Ness in the North West quadrant of the city with several branch campus across Washington, DC. Other campuses include the Bertie Backus Campus, Union Station Campus, Congress Heights Campus, and the UDC Firebird Farm.

History 

 
University of the District of Columbia was consolidated in August 1, 1977  with the merge of Teachers College, Federal City College, and Washington Technical Institute.

Normal School for Colored Girls

Myrtilla Miner with six pupils founded the Normal School for Colored Girls against considerable racist opposition. On December 3, 1851, it started operations in a rented room about fourteen feet square, in a frame house then owned and occupied as a dwelling by African American Edward Younger. This was the first normal school in the District of Columbia and the fourth one in the United States.

The school trained young black women to become teachers. Among its benefactors were the Society of Friends, Henry Ward Beecher, and his sister Harriet Beecher Stowe; Stowe donated $1,000 from the sales of her book Uncle Tom’s Cabin. Although Mayor Walter Lenox believed that education would make Blacks a "restless population" and local residents formed some mobs in opposition to the school, the school remained open until the Civil War began. By 1879, the Normal School for Colored Girls was then known as Miner Normal School. It joined the D.C. public education system.

In 1873, Another institution for white girls was established in Washington D.C. in 1913 was named the Washington Normal School, and it was renamed the Wilson Normal School
In 1977 the schools were merged and consolidated into the only public university in Washington, D.C.

District of Columbia Teachers College

In 1929, the United States Congress made both schools Miner Normal School and James Ormond Wilson Normal School four-year teachers' colleges and designated Miner Teachers College for African Americans and Wilson Teachers College for white people. In 1955, following Brown v. Board of Education, the two schools merged into the District of Columbia Teachers College.

Federal City College & Washington Technical Institute

U.S. Senator Wayne Morse of Oregon and Representative Ancher Nelsen of Minnesota sponsored the District of District of Columbia School Reform Act, it was enacted on November 7, 1966, as (Public Law 89-791), which established two additional institutions:

 The Federal City College was created as a four-year liberal arts college. It was originally planned to be a small, selective college of about 700 students. By the time the college opened in 1968, however, admission was open and applications had soared to 6000; students were placed by lottery. 

 The Washington Technical Institute was established as a technical school. 

Both institutions were also given land-grant status and awarded a $7.24 million endowment (USD), in lieu of a land grant. The Middle States Association of Colleges and Schools (MACS) initially accredited the Washington Technical Institute in 1971 and Federal City College in 1974.

University of the District of Columbia

Efforts to unify the D.C. Teachers College, Federal City College, and Washington Technical Institute under a single administrative structure began in earnest after the passage of the District of Columbia Home Rule Act. A merger of the institutions was approved in 1975, and on August 1, 1977, the three institutions were formally consolidated as the University of the District of Columbia, with Lisle C. Carter named its first president. The Council of the District of Columbia later passed legislation merging the District of Columbia School of Law with the University of the District of Columbia in 1996.

Beginning with the 2009–2010 academic year, UDC's programs were split into two separate institutions under an umbrella "university system"-style setup. A new Community College (UDC-CC) assumed UDC's associate's degree, certificate, continuing education, and workforce development programs, while the UDC Flagship campus continued with its bachelor's and graduate degree programs.  While UDC-CC maintained an open enrollment policy for entry to its associate degree programs, a high school diploma no longer guaranteed admission into UDC’s flagship programs.

In late 2012, the university reported that its average expenses of "$35,152 [per full-time student] are 66 percent higher than expenses for comparable schools."  To cut costs, UDC underwent a reorganization and eliminated several degree programs.

In 2012 and 2013, the university eliminated 97 full-time equivalent positions including abolished positions, executive appointments, and vacant funded positions. In late December 2012, the Board of Trustees approved a change in the university's executive administration and appointed Dr. Rachel Petty to serve as interim COO. During the spring of 2013 James E. Lyons Sr. was hired as an interim President to lead the institution through strategic planning. Since July 1, 2015, president Ronald Mason has led the resurgence of the university by implementing its Equity Imperative. UDC expanded its footprint through campus expansions and community extensions across the District of Columbia. In 2021, the university was ranked 59th in U.S. News & World Report annual list of Top Performers on Social Mobility for Regional Universities North.

The university launched the District of Columbia's Institute of Politics Policy and History in 2019. In response to the 2020 racial justice uprisings, the university launched the Institute for the Study and Elimination of White Supremacy

Academics
UDC offers 81 undergraduate and graduate degree programs.  The Workforce Development Program also offers a variety of practical, nonacademic educational programs and training. The university is accredited by the Middle States Commission on Higher Education. UDC spends $35,152 per full-time student.
IPEDs reports UDC's full-time student graduation to be 15%; although UDC graduates more District resident students than any college or university in the District of Columbia. The university relaunched doctoral programs in 2019 with PhDs in Computer Science & Engineering and Urban Leadership & Entrepreneurship. UDC also has an accredited law school. There are presently six historically black colleges and universities in the United States housing Historically black law schools: Howard University, Texas Southern University, Southern University, Florida Agricultural and Mechanical University (FAMU), North Carolina Central University, and the University of the District of Columbia. The Felix Grant Jazz Archives are maintained by the University of the District of Columbia's Jazz Studies Program within the university library. The majority of the archives' holdings consist of about 45,000 LP albums, 10,000 CDs, reel-to-reel tapes, audio cassettes, 45s, and 78s which were donated to the university by Grant. Books, periodicals, photographs, and other paper materials complement the sound recordings.

Schools and colleges
 College of Agriculture, Urban Sustainability & Environmental Sciences (CAUSES)
 College of Arts & Sciences (CAS)
 School of Business & Public Administration (SBPA)
 School of Engineering and Applied Sciences (SEAS)
 David A. Clarke School of Law (formerly the Antioch School of Law)
 Research and Graduate Studies
 University of the District of Columbia Community College (UDC-CC)

Faculty
Among UDC's faculty are Paul Cooke who taught English and directed several plays at the university for 22 years including serving as president and historian C.L.R. James who taught at the university from 1972 to 1980 and whose work is a staple of subaltern studies and postcolonial literature.

International programs
A 1996 academic partnership with the Modern Academy In Maadi (located in Maadi, a southern suburb of Cairo, Egypt) encourages the material, physical, and intellectual growth of students, faculty, and staff of both institutions through Cairo-based UDC Bachelor's degrees, Computer Science and Business Administration management programs. In July 2001, the partnership included Accounting and Finance options in Business, Computer Engineering and Information Technology and Electronic Engineering and Communication Technology and graduate studies in Business Administration (MBA).

The Maadi branch campus partnership ended in June 2014. All matriculating students will participate in a teach-out process. No degrees will be conferred after May 2016 to any currently enrolled students.

The UDC's adult education department had a collegial relationship with the University of Nairobi for several years, including faculty exchange and doctoral student sponsoring.

Ranking

UDC is ranked #136-#176 in Regional Universities North by U.S. News & World Report.

Campus
The flagship campus of UDC, known as the Van Ness campus, is in the North Cleveland Park neighborhood at Connecticut Avenue and Van Ness Street in Northwest Washington, D.C. It lends its name to the nearby Van Ness–UDC Metrorail station.

Primarily a commuter school, UDC opened its first residential accommodations or dormitories in August 2010 by leasing an apartment building across the street from its campus. UDC plans to open a new residence hall on its main campus by 2012 that could house as many as 300 students. Construction of a new $40 million student center also began in 2012.

The Van Ness Campus opened in 1968 as the campus of the Washington Technical Institute, occupying buildings vacated by the National Bureau of Standards. Following the announcement of the UDC in 1975, work began on redeveloping the campus, with the construction of Buildings 32, 38, and 39 completed in 1976. Seven additional buildings opened in 1981 at the conclusion of a second phase of construction. The DCTC facilities at the old Wilson Teachers College building at 11th and Harvard Streets, NW and at the Franklin School were retired.

Mt. Vernon Square was selected as the site for Federal City College in 1968, and in 1973 FCC took control of the Carnegie Library, closed in 1970 in anticipation of the D.C. Public Library's move to the Martin Luther King Jr. Memorial Library. Funding for the campus did not materialize until 1978, however. Facing declining enrollment and lack of funding, operations at the downtown campus were wound down in the 1990s, and the facilities shuttered. "UDC" was removed from the name of the nearby Mount Vernon Square Metro Station in 2001.

In January 2019, UDC leased property near its Van Ness campus as part of its project to improve its infrastructure.

Athletics

The University of the District of Columbia athletic teams are known as the UDC Firebirds. The university is a member of the National Collegiate Athletic Association (NCAA) and competes at the Division II level as a member of the East Coast Conference (ECC). The university currently fields ten varsity sports, five men's sports: basketball, cross country, soccer, tennis, lacrosse; and six women's sports: basketball, cross country, tennis, indoor and outdoor track & field, and volleyball. In 2012, the university announced plans for athletic expansion, with the addition of men's and women's lacrosse in 2014 and soon thereafter men's and women's swimming.

Student activities

Greek Letter organizations

National Pan-Hellenic Council
All nine of the National Pan-Hellenic Council organizations currently have chapters at the University of the District of Columbia.

Non-NPHC organizations

Student media
UDC publishes The Trilogy, a student-paper highlighting campus events and national and local news.  The Flightpath yearbook focuses on graduating students and the years' activities.

Television
UDC Cable Television, Channel 19, is the District Government's non-commercial, adult education program service.

UDC Cable TV 98 supports teaching, research and public service with educational-access television and instructional programming. Cable TV 98 operates an audio and video recording service center, electronic field and studio production and a video training center for Public-access television production.

UDC Police Department
The UDC Police Department (UDCPD) is an operating element within the Office of Public Safety & Emergency Management (OPSEM). The UDCPD is tasked with providing full service policing for all UDC assets and stakeholders in Washington DC, Maryland and Virginia - 24 hours a day, 7 days a week 365 days a year. The department consists of commissioned Police Officers and non-sworn support staff. UDCPD officers have full authority to investigate crimes, respond to calls for service and effect arrests on any UDC property. OPSEM and the UDCPD are under the command of Marieo Foster who serves as the Chief of Police and Director of Public Safety.

Notable alumni
Branislav Andjelić - Serbian Internet pioneer, economist and politician
Amadou Gallo - Vice President and managing director of NBA Africa and President of Basketball Africa League
Denis Godwin Antoine - Ambassador of Grenada to the US and representative to the Organization of American States
Johnny Grier - First African-American referee in the National Football League
Euphemia Haynes - 1st African-American woman to gain a PhD in mathematics in 1943
Norma Holloway Johnson - Former United States federal judge who ruled on Kenneth Starr's probe of the Clinton administration
Ruby Ruffin Hurley - Activist, Organizer, National NAACP official 
Earl Jones - Professional NBA player
Dolores Kendrick Washington - Poet Laureate of Washington, D.C.
Roger Ramsammy - 7th President of the Hudson Valley Community College
Cathy L. Lanier - 1st female Chief of Police with the Metropolitan Police Department of the District of Columbia and head of NFL security 
Lyn McLain - Cofounder of the DC Youth Orchestra Program
Aldon Lynn Nielsen - Poet
Richard Pennington - Former Chief of Police of Atlanta, Georgia
Portia Shields - 1st female President of Albany State University
Frank Ski - is an American DJ, journalist, philanthropist, radio personality and public forums host
Abdul Thompson Conteh - Professional soccer player
Brian Thompson - Designer of the United States $100 bill
John Thompson - first African-American head coach to win a major collegiate championship in basketball when he led the Georgetown Hoyas to the NCAA Division I national championship in 1984  
Thelma Thompson - President of the University of Maryland Eastern Shore
Kali Troy - Voice over actress
Nadine Winter - 1st African-American woman elected to the Council of the District of Columbia
Rasheim Wright - Jordanian basketball player
Lennox Yearwood - President of the Hip Hop Caucus

See also

 Normal School for Colored Girls
 Felix Grant

References

External links

Official UDC Athletics website

 
Universities and colleges in Washington, D.C.
District of Columbia
University of the District Of Columbia
Educational institutions established in 1851
1851 establishments in Washington, D.C.
Educational institutions established in 1977
1977 establishments in Washington, D.C.
East Coast Conference schools
Antebellum educational institutions that admitted African Americans